Alan Branigan is a retired Ivorian-American football (soccer) defender who spent his entire career in the United States.

Branigan and his family moved to the United States when he was seven and settled in Nutley, New Jersey.  In 1993, he graduated from Nutley High School. He attended Rutgers University, where he was a 1996 Third-Team All-American soccer player.

On February 1, 1997, the Dallas Burn selected Branigan in the second round (sixteenth overall) of the 1997 MLS College Draft.  The Burn released him during the preseason and he signed with the Orlando Sundogs.  When the Sundogs began to experience financial difficulties, the team released Branigan and several other players.  He played three games for the Carolina Dynamo.  He then joined the Worcester Wildfire for the remainder of the 1997 season.  In 1998, he signed with the Hampton Roads Mariners and remained with the team for three seasons.

Branigan is now the coach of the James Caldwell High School boys soccer team, of which he has coached for the last 5 years.

References

Living people
North Carolina Fusion U23 players
Virginia Beach Mariners players
Ivorian footballers
Ivorian expatriate footballers
Ivorian emigrants to the United States
Nutley High School alumni
Orlando Sundogs players
People from Nutley, New Jersey
Rutgers Scarlet Knights men's soccer players
Soccer players from New Jersey
Sportspeople from Essex County, New Jersey
Worcester Wildfire players
FC Dallas draft picks
A-League (1995–2004) players
Association football defenders
Year of birth missing (living people)